Bank Respublika Arena former Alinja Arena is a multi-use stadium in Masazır settlement of Absheron, Azerbaijan. It is currently used mostly for football matches. The stadium holds 13,000 people and opened in 2014.

References

See also
List of football stadiums in Azerbaijan

Football venues in Azerbaijan
Sports venues in Baku